Liberty Hall, also known as Outlaw House, is a historic plantation house located near Windsor, Bertie County, North Carolina. It was built about 1855, and is a two-story, three bay, frame dwelling with Italianate style design elements.  It sits on a high brick basement.  Also on the property is a contributing outbuilding.

It was added to the National Register of Historic Places in 1982.

References

Plantation houses in North Carolina
Houses on the National Register of Historic Places in North Carolina
Italianate architecture in North Carolina
Houses completed in 1855
Houses in Bertie County, North Carolina
National Register of Historic Places in Bertie County, North Carolina